Herbert Louis (né Lewis) Mason (1896–1994) was an American botany professor, plant collector, and herbarium director.

After graduating from high school, Herbert Mason and his identical twin brother matriculated at Stanford University. Their education was interrupted when they both volunteered for military service in WW I and served in a U.S. Army hospital in Beaune, France. After the end of the war, Herbert Mason returned to Stanford University and received his bachelor's degree there in 1921. He became a graduate student at the University of California, Berkeley (U.C. Berkeley) and received an M.A. there in 1923. From 1923 to 1925 he taught at Mills College. From 1925 to 1931 Mason was employed as an associate in Willis L. Jepson's Phenogamic Laboratory. In 1932 he received his Ph.D. from U.C. Berkeley. His thesis committee consisted of W. L. Jepson (as committee chair), Ralph Works Chaney, and Charles Lewis Camp. In 1932 Mason participated in an expedition to the Bering Sea and the Arctic Ocean. At Jepson Herbarium and jointly in U.C. Berkeley's botany department, Mason was appointed in 1933 assistant curator and instructor, in 1934 associate curator and assistant professor, in 1938 (full) curator and associate professor, in 1941 herbarium director and (full) professor, retiring in 1963 with emeritus status. The years of Mason's directorship were a time of rapid growth for Jepson Herbarium. From 1935 to 1963 he was a member of the board of editors of the journal Madroño, where he was assisted for many years by Annetta Mary Carter, Ethel Katherine Crum, and Helen Sharsmith.

In 1949 he became one of the founders of the Regional Parks Association, which has the stated goal of protecting natural resource in the East Bay region of the San Francisco Bay Area.

For volume 3 of the 4-volume series Illustrated Flora of the Pacific States by LeRoy Abrams, Mason wrote the section on the phlox family Polemoniaceae except for the genus Polemonium, which was written by John Fraser Davidson, and the genus Gilia, which Mason wrote jointly with Alva Day Grant. In preparing his manuscript for volume 3, Mason found that 5 five species of Navarretia were scientifically undescribed.

He collected plants in California, Nevada, Oregon, Arizona, Colombia, and Mexico's Revillagigedo Islands.

In May 1931 in Skagit County, Washington he married Lucile Roush (1896–1986), who was a student along with him at both Stanford and Berkeley. She received her Ph.D. from U. C. Berkeley with a thesis on coralline algae. When he retired in 1963 they moved to Washington state in order to be near their son David Thomas Mason, who was a professor at Western Washington University.

References

External links
 

1896 births
1994 deaths
20th-century American botanists
Plant collectors
Stanford University alumni
University of California, Berkeley alumni
University of California, Berkeley faculty
American expatriates in France